Indiana Harbor may refer to:
 Indiana Harbor and Ship Canal, a harbor and artificial waterway in East Chicago, Indiana connecting Lake Michigan to the Grand Calumet River
 Indiana Harbor (East Chicago), the section of East Chicago located east of the Indiana Harbor and Ship Canal
 Indiana Harbor Works, a steel mill built by Inland Steel and since 2020 operated by Cleveland-Cliffs
 MV Indiana Harbor, a lake freighter built in 1979